Gilang Ramadhan (born 10 February 1995) is an Indonesian beach volleyball player from Bandar Lampung. Ramadhan was a gold medalist at the 2016 Pekan Olahraga Nasional held in Bandung, West Java, partnered with Ade Candra Rachmawan. He and Rachmawan also competed at the 2016 Asian Beach Games in Da Nang, Vietnam, finish in the fourth position after lost to Kazakhstani duo in the bronze medal match. In 2018, Ramadhan alongside Danangsyah Pribadi won a bronze medal at the 2018 Asian Games in Palembang, Indonesia.

References

External links
 
 

1995 births
Living people
People from Bandar Lampung
Sportspeople from Lampung
Indonesian beach volleyball players
Asian Games bronze medalists for Indonesia
Asian Games medalists in beach volleyball
Medalists at the 2018 Asian Games
Beach volleyball players at the 2018 Asian Games
Competitors at the 2019 Southeast Asian Games
Southeast Asian Games gold medalists for Indonesia
Southeast Asian Games medalists in volleyball
Competitors at the 2021 Southeast Asian Games
21st-century Indonesian people